Get Back is a compilation album of Ike & Tina Turner's hits songs released by Liberty Records in March 1985.

Content and release 
The album features songs the duo released as singles with the exception of "Let's Spend the Night Together" by the Rolling Stones which was released on Tina Turner's 1975 solo album Acid Queen.

Get Back was released nearly a year after Tina's critically acclaimed Private Dancer album. It reached at number 189 on the Billboard Top Pop Albums chart.

Critical reception 
Cash Box (April 6, 1985): In the wake of Tina Turner's massive comeback success, this reissue of the duo's greatest hits should do well. Includes "Proud Mary," "River Deep, Mountain High" and "Nutbush City Limits."

Track listing

Chart performance

References 

1985 greatest hits albums
Ike & Tina Turner compilation albums
Albums produced by Ike Turner
Liberty Records compilation albums